Ha-seong Kim (born October 17, 1995) is a South Korean professional baseball shortstop for the San Diego Padres of Major League Baseball (MLB). Kim was drafted 41st overall by the Nexen Heroes in the 2014 Korea Baseball Organization Draft. He made his KBO debut with the Heroes in May 2014 and won the Golden Glove Award in 2018, 2019 and 2020. In December 2020, Kim signed with the San Diego Padres.

Early life 
Kim was born on October 17, 1995, in Bucheon, Gyeonggi Province, the youngest of three children.

Amateur career

High school 
Kim attended Yatap High School in Seongnam, Gyeonggi, and in 2013 led his high school to a runner-up finish in the National High school Baseball Tournament. In his final high school baseball season, Kim hit for a .375 batting average and recorded a .477 on base percentage along with 20 base steals.

Professional career

Nexen/Kiwoom Heroes 
Kim was drafted by the Nexen Heroes with the 29th overall of the third round in the 2014 Korea Baseball Organization Draft out of Yatap High school in Seongnam, Gyeonggi.

On May 18, He made his KBO debut against the Lotte Giants. He hit a double on his first at-bat, and a triple on his second at-bat. On June 4, Kim hit his first career home run in a 20-3 loss against the NC Dinos.

In the 2014 postseason, he appeared once as a pinch runner against the Samsung Lions.

Batting .290 with 19 home runs and 73 RBIs, Kim was the starting shortstop at the 2015 KBO All-Star Game. He recorded his 10th stolen base on June 12, 2015 against the Kt Wiz in a 12-8 loss. He recorded his 20th stolen base on September 21, 2015 in a win against the NC Dinos. He hit his 19th home run on September 23, 2015 against the SK Wyverns. He finished the season with 19 home runs and 22 stolen bases, just one home run short of a 20-20.

Before the start of the 2016 season, Kim signed a one-year ₩160 million contract extension with the Nexen Heroes. Kim played all 144 games in the 2016 regular season while batting .281 with 20 home runs and 84 RBIs to go along with 28 stolen bases. Kim was selected as an All-Star for the second time in his third year. Kim was the starting shortstop at the 2016 KBO All-Star Game. He recorded his 20th home run on September 20, 2016 against the KIA Tigers. This home run made him the third shortshop in KBO history to record 20 home runs and 20 stolen bases in the regular season.

Kim won the KBO League Golden Glove Award in three consecutive years, from 2018 to 2020.

After the 2020 season, on November 25, 2020, the Heroes announced it was allowing Kim to enter the posting system to play in Major League Baseball (MLB).

San Diego Padres
On December 31, 2020, Kim signed with the San Diego Padres of the MLB for a four-year, $28 million deal, including a mutual option for the 2025 season.

Kim made his major-league debut on April 1, 2021. He pinch hit for Emilio Pagán, and struck out against Alex Young of the Arizona Diamondbacks. Kim hit his first MLB home run in a 7-4 victory over the Texas Rangers in Arlington, Texas on April 10, 2021.

On June 19, 2021, after the Padres lost Fernando Tatis Jr. due to injury, Kim hit a two-run home run in the bottom of the eighth inning to lead the Padres to a 7-5 victory against the Cincinnati Reds.

Kim saw increased playing time at shortstop for the Padres after Tatis was placed on the injured list in late July 2021. On August 1, 2021, Kim hit a home run and drove in an MLB-career high three runs in his first game filling in for Tatis at shortstop. Kim finished the 2021 season batting .202 with eight home runs, 34 RBIs, and six stolen bases in 117 games.

On August 26, 2022, Kim had a career-high five RBIs in a game against the Kansas City Royals. 

Kim finished the 2022 season with a .251 batting average, 11 home runs, 59 RBI, 12 stolen bases, and a .708 OPS in 150 games played. He mostly played as a shortstop in the season, filling in for Tatis Jr.

International career 
Kim represented the South Korea national baseball team at the 2013 18U Baseball World Cup, 2017 World Baseball Classic,2017 Asia Professional Baseball Championship, 2018 Asian Games and 2019 WBSC Premier12.

In 2013 18U Baseball World Cup, Kim batted .433, going 13-for-30, driving in three RBIs and scoring 9 runs. South Korea finished 5th in the tournament.

In 2019 WBSC Premier12, Kim was named the best shortstop.

References

External links
Career statistics and player information from the KBO League

Kim Ha-seong at Nexen Heroes Baseball Club 

1995 births
Living people
Asian Games gold medalists for South Korea
Asian Games medalists in baseball
Baseball players at the 2018 Asian Games
KBO League shortstops
Kiwoom Heroes players
Major League Baseball infielders
Major League Baseball players from South Korea
Medalists at the 2018 Asian Games
People from Bucheon
San Diego Padres players
South Korean expatriate baseball players in the United States
2017 World Baseball Classic players
2023 World Baseball Classic players
2019 WBSC Premier12 players
Sportspeople from Gyeonggi Province